The Similkameen River runs through southern British Columbia, Canada, eventually discharging into the Okanagan River near Oroville, Washington, in the United States. Through the Okanagan River, it drains to the Columbia River. The river is said to be named for an indigenous people called Similkameigh, meaning "treacherous waters".

The river is controversially dammed (the now-defunct Enloe Dam), blocking fish passage to the upper (Canadian) reaches of the river.

History
The first mention of the Similkameen by a European was by Alexander Ross. While on a trading expedition, he travelled by way of the "Similkameigh River." Sir George Simpson used the name "Similkameigh" for one of the groups part of the Okanagan Nation. The transition from Similkameigh to Similkameen may have been inspired by the name of the Tulameen River despite being etymologically incorrect. The name Similkameigh comes from a now-extinct language of Nicola-Similkameen, of the Athapascan languages, and is believed to mean "Salmon River."

Geography

Course
Numerous viewpoints of the river occur from the highway, the most popular being Bromley Rock, where swimming in the river from a spectacular sandy beach is possible. In a typical Okanagan, BC summer, the water is warm and fantastic for swimming. It contributes 75% of the flow of the Okanogan River and crosses the international border at Nighthawk, Washington.

Flow
The United States Geological Survey maintains a stream gauge at river mile 15.8, just upstream from the Oroville–Tonasket Irrigation District canal intake.

Enloe Dam

The Enloe Dam, completed in 1920, is located just above the river's mouth. The river, after flowing over the dam, drops over what is left of Coyote Falls. Lacking fish ladders, Enloe Dam blocks fish passage and completely extirpated anadromous fish migration into the upper reaches of the Similkameen River and its tributaries in Canada. 
  However, Coyote Falls is 20 feet tall thus making it impossible for salmon (who can only jump 12 feet) to migrate further than that point and would never reach the dam.

International

The Similkameen River subject to international water-sharing agreements governed by the International Joint Commission as part of the Columbia Basin. The authority responsible for overseeing the IJC agreements is the International Osoyoos Lake Board of Control, composed of appointees from Environment Canada, the BC Ministry of Water, Land Air Protection, the US Army Corps of Engineers, the US Geological Survey, and private consultants.

Major tributaries 
Pasayten River: Confluence is just above Similkameen Falls
Tulameen River: Enters at Princeton
Ashnola River: Meets the river 11 km west of Keremeos

See also
List of British Columbia rivers
List of Washington rivers

References 

Rivers of British Columbia
Rivers of Washington (state)
Rivers of Okanogan County, Washington
Similkameen Country
International rivers of North America
Washington placenames of Native American origin